Cystopteris bulbifera, with the common name bulblet fern, bulblet bladderfern, or bulblet fragile fern is a fern in the family Cystopteridaceae.

Distribution
The fern is native to eastern Canada, the Midwestern and Eastern United States, and two disjunct populations in the Southwestern United States.

It is found only on calcareous substrates such as limestone. It commonly festoons limestone cave openings. While most commonly found on vertical rock faces, it also grows in rocky scree.

Description
Cystopteris bulbifera is a low-growing rock fern with creeping stems and narrow elongate deltate fronds which grow to 75 cm (30 in). C. bulbifera is unusual among ferns in producing bulblets along the bottom of the fronds. This is one of the easiest Cystopteris species to identify.

Hybrids
This species is known to hybridize with Cystopteris fragilis, Cystopteris protrusa, Cystopteris reevesiana, and Cystopteris tenuis. Hybrids with C. fragilis have given rise to the allohexaploid species C. laurentiana. Hybrids with C. protrusa have given rise to the allotetraploid species C. tennesseensis. The hybrid with C. reevesiana has given rise to the allotetraploid species C. utahensis. The hybrid with C. tenuis is known as C. × illinoensis, an allotriploid. Also see Cystopteris hybrid complex.

References

Further reading
A Field Guide to Ferns and their Related Families of Northeastern and Central North America — Cobb, Boughton. (1984), Peterson Field Guides series.

External links
Flora of North America: Cystopteris bulbifera — distribution map
USDA Plants Profile for Cystopteris bulbifera
Connecticut Botanical Society: Cystopteris bulbifera

bulbifera
Ferns of Canada
Ferns of the United States
Plants described in 1753
Taxa named by Carl Linnaeus